Julio Cengarle is a retired Argentine-American football (soccer) midfielder who played professionally in the United States, Costa Rica and Puerto Rico.

Cengarle moved to the United States as a boy.  In 1989, he graduated from Don Bosco Preparatory High School in New Jersey.  Cengarle attended Montclair State College where he played on the men's soccer team from 1989 to 1991.  He graduated with a bachelor's degree in 1995.

On February 1, 1998, the Colorado Rapids selected Cengarle in the first round (eleventh overall) of the 1998 MLS Supplemental Draft.  On March 4, 1998, the Rapids released Cengarle.  He then signed with the Staten Island Vipers but left the team to join the Jacksonville Cyclones of the USISL A-League.

In 2007, he became an assistant with the New Jersey City University men's soccer team.

References

External links
 New Jersey City University: Julio Cengarle

1971 births
Living people
Footballers from Rosario, Santa Fe
American soccer coaches
American soccer players
Jacksonville Cyclones players
Staten Island Vipers players
A-League (1995–2004) players
Rosario Central footballers
Colorado Rapids draft picks
Argentine emigrants to the United States
Association football defenders